Ahmed Magdy may refer to:
 Ahmed Magdy (footballer, born 1986), Egyptian football defender
 Ahmed Magdy (footballer, born 1989), Egyptian football right wing back
 Ahmed Magdy (actor) (born 1986), Egyptian-Algerian actor and director